The Mississagi Strait is a narrow strait or channel in Manitoulin District, Ontario, Canada, located in Lake Huron. It connects the North Channel to the main water body, and also separates Manitoulin Island to the east from Cockburn Island to the west.

References

Landforms of Manitoulin District
Lake Huron
Straits of Canada
Bodies of water of Ontario